General elections were held in Burundi on 20 May 2020 to elect both the president and the National Assembly. Évariste Ndayishimiye of the ruling CNDD–FDD was elected president with 71% of the vote. In the National Assembly elections, the CNDD–FDD won 72 of the 100 elected seats.

Electoral system
The president is elected for a seven-year term using the two-round system. If no candidate receives a majority of the vote in the first round, a second round will be held. 100 members of the National Assembly are elected for a five-year term from 18 multi-member constituencies based on the provinces using the closed list proportional representation system. Seats are allocated using the d'Hondt method with a national 2% electoral threshold. A further three members of the Twa ethnic group are appointed, and more members are co-opted to ensure a 60–40 split between Hutus and Tutsis, and a 30% quota for female MPs.

Campaign
Incumbent President Pierre Nkurunziza, in power since 2005, announced in December 2018 that he would not contest the elections. In response, the main opposition alliance, CNARED, announced that they would return from exile in Belgium to participate in the elections for the first time since 2005.

In January 2020, the CNDD–FDD chose the party's secretary general Évariste Ndayishimiye as its presidential candidate. In February, the National Congress for Liberty selected Agathon Rwasa as their candidate.

Gaston Sindimwo, the First Vice President of Burundi, announced he would run as the Union for National Progress nominee. 

Dieudonné Nahimana, Léonce Ngendakumana, Francis Rohero and Domitien Ndayizeye also ran in the elections.

Conduct
In December 2017, the government introduced a voluntary election levy. However, Human Rights Watch accused the youth wing of the ruling CNDD–FDD and local government officials of extorting the money from citizens in the buildup to the elections, sometimes demanding the donation multiple times.

According to the Burundi Human Rights Initiative, election day was marred by irregularities including the arrests of opposition leaders and people voting multiple times. Long queues formed at polling stations.

Results

President

National Assembly
The three Twa representatives were from the ASSEJEBA, UJEDECO and UNIPROBA parties.

Reactions

Domestic
 Conference of Bishops of Burundi: Issued a statement criticizing the transparency and freedom of the election process. The church deployed around 2,716 observers across Burundi's 119 municipalities. The conference's observers witnessed intimidation and expulsion of opposition observers from the polling and vote counting stations. The church condemned the ruling party for engaging in national election fraud.
National Congress for Liberty: The main opposition party filed a case at the Constitutional Court of Burundi challenging the elections and accusing the ruling factions of electoral fraud. The party says they have various instances of evidence where ballot stuffing was conducted. The party aims to take the case to the East African Court of Justice if they are unsuccessful.

International 
Due to the travel restrictions imposed by COVID-19 pandemic, there were almost no international observers present in the country. 

  East African Community: Gave the election a clean bill and expressed its support towards Burundi holding peaceful elections. The body issued a statement saying that "The 2020 Burundi elections hold an iconic place in the history of the nation, marking this the first peaceful and democratic transfer of power. More significantly, the process was domestically driven through own funding. The peaceful conclusion of the electoral process will not only be a big win for the people of Burundi, but for the East African Community as a region."
 Amnesty International: Condemned the conditions leading up to the election saying that “There were continued reports of killings, arbitrary arrests, beatings and disappearances of opposition members, as well as social media censorship on election day."

References

Burundi
General
Elections in Burundi
Burundi
Presidential elections in Burundi